Judivan Flor da Silva (born 21 May 1995), simply known as Judivan, is a Brazilian professional footballer who plays as a forward for Khon Kaen. Judivan has also played for his country at U-20 level and donned the Brazil shirt during the World Cup in 2015, when he played four matches and scored two goals after that his participation was ended due to injury.

References

External links

1995 births
Living people
Sportspeople from Paraíba
Brazilian footballers
Association football forwards
Campeonato Brasileiro Série A players
Campeonato Brasileiro Série B players
Campeonato Brasileiro Série C players
Cruzeiro Esporte Clube players
América Futebol Clube (MG) players
Centro Sportivo Alagoano players
Tombense Futebol Clube players
Paraná Clube players
Brazil under-20 international footballers
Brazil youth international footballers